= Trebendae =

Town of ancient Lycia

Coordinates: 36°16′08″N 29°56′45″E

Trebendae or Trebendai was a town of ancient Lycia.

Its site is located near Gürses in Asiatic Turkey.
